The 2006 MLS Expansion Draft, held on November 17, 2006 was a special draft for MLS expansion team Toronto FC. Toronto FC selected 10 players from a pool of players from current MLS clubs.

Format
 Only one player could be selected from each team. Two of the league's 12 teams did not have a player selected.
 Teams were allowed to protect 11 players from their 28-man rosters. Generation adidas players were automatically protected, though players who had graduated from the program to the senior roster at the end of the 2006 season were not.
 Each team could only leave one senior international player unprotected.

Expansion Draft

Following the draft, RSL traded a partial allocation (est. at US$ 125,000) to Toronto for Jason Kreis. Hesmer and O'Rourke were traded to Columbus for another allocation. Regan was traded to Red Bulls for forward Edson Buddle. Serioux was traded, along with Toronto's 2nd round 2007 MLS Superdraft pick to Dallas for midfielder Ronnie O'Brien. Nate Jaqua was traded to the Los Angeles Galaxy for a partial allocation. Dyachenko was later returned to D.C. for a future draft pick, Kotschau was released, and Cancela was later traded to the Colorado Rapids. Part way through the season Nagamura was later traded to Chivas USA for a 1st round 2008 MLS SuperDraft pick. This left no players from the expansion draft on the TFC roster.

Team-by Team breakdown
Source

Chicago Fire

Chivas USA

Colorado Rapids

Columbus Crew

D.C. United

FC Dallas

Houston Dynamo

Kansas City Wizards

Los Angeles Galaxy

New England Revolution

New York Red Bulls

Real Salt Lake

External links
 Toronto FC to add 10 players Nov. 17

Major League Soccer Expansion Draft
Expansion Draft
MLS Expansion Draft